Department of Biochemistry may refer to:

 Department of Biochemistry, University of Oxford
 Department of Biochemistry and Molecular Biology, Johns Hopkins University